Born Again is a 1978 American biographical drama film directed by Hollywood veteran Irving Rapper depicting the involvement of Charles Colson in the Watergate scandal, his subsequent conversion to Christianity and his prison term. It stars Dean Jones as Colson, Anne Francis as his wife, Dana Andrews as Tom Phillips, Harry Spillman as President Nixon, former Senator Harold Hughes as himself and George Brent in his final film. The film was released by Avco Embassy Pictures.

The title theme song "Born Again," with music by Les Baxter and lyrics by Craig Johnson, was sung by Larnelle Harris.

Plot
As president Richard Nixon's special counsel, Colson has power and prestige along with an office in the White House. After the Watergate scandal, Colson pleads guilty and is sent to prison. The experience changes him drastically, and he establishes Prison Fellowship International, a Christian ministry that now reaches around the world.

Cast
Dean Jones as Charles Colson
Anne Francis as Patty Colson
Jay Robinson as David Shapiro
Dana Andrews as Tom Phillips
Raymond St. Jacques as Jimmy Newsom
George Brent as Judge Gerhard Gesell
Harold Hughes as Himself
Billy Graham as Himself
Harry Spillman as President Richard M. Nixon
Scott Walker as Scanlon
Robert Gray as Paul Kramer
Arthur Roberts as Al Quie
Ned Wilson as Douglas Coe
Dean Brooks as Dick Howard
Christopher Conrad as Christian "Chris" Colson
Peter Jurasik as Henry Kissinger
Stuart Lee as Wendell Colson
Richard Caine as H.R. Haldeman
Brigid O'Brien as Holly Holm
Robert Broyles as John Ehrlichman
Anthony Canne as Burkhardt
Corinne Michaels as Raquel Ramirez

Production
Filming for Born Again took place between December 14, 1977 and February 8, 1978 at locations in Washington, D.C. including the Capitol Building, the White House, the Executive Office Building, the Justice Department, the Washington Monument, the Jefferson Memorial, the Lincoln Memorial, St. John's Episcopal Church, Lafayette Square and the Watergate complex.

Some exteriors were filmed in California. The Los Angeles County Superior Court stood in for Judge Gesell's Washington courtroom and the Chino penitentiary known officially as the California Institution for Men doubled as the federal prison camp on Maxwell Air Force Base in Montgomery, Alabama, where Colson served his sentence. Soundstage interiors filmed at The Burbank Studios in Burbank, California included replicas of the offices of H.R. Haldeman, John Ehrlichman and Colson, and Colson donated several items that were used in the set.

Release
The world premiere of Born Again was held at the Kennedy Center in Washington, D.C. on September 24, 1978, with Charles Colson in attendance.

Two hundred prints of the film were released over a series of two-week periods in three successive regional waves:

 September 29 and October 6, 1978: Washington, D.C., Chicago, Dallas, Seattle, Cincinnati, Atlanta and Portland, Oregon
 November 3 to December 10, 1978: Charlotte, Los Angeles, Denver and Milwaukee
 Christmas and New Year's 1978-79: Minneapolis, Des Moines, Tampa/St. Petersburg, Indianapolis and New Orleans

The film's producers partnered with a religious public-relations expert to promote the film to the Christian community nationwide. The outreach campaign included premieres to benefit Colson’s charity, Prison Fellowship.

Reception
A TV Guide review stated: "In Born Again Colson (played by Jones) realizes the error of his ways and is born again. His faith sustains him through his prison term. In this sympathetic script, Colson emerges as an innocent who is drawn into the devious machinations of Washington without his actually engaging in anything untoward."

Home media
On January 13, 2009, a 30th-anniversary edition of the film was released on DVD in Region 1 by Crown Movie Classics.

References

External links
 
 
 

1978 films
1978 independent films
1970s biographical drama films
American biographical drama films
American independent films
American films based on actual events
Embassy Pictures films
1970s English-language films
Films about Christianity
Films based on biographies
Films directed by Irving Rapper
Films scored by Les Baxter
Films set in 1969
Films set in 1973
Films set in 1974
Films set in Washington, D.C.
Films shot in Los Angeles
Films shot in Washington, D.C.
Watergate scandal in film
1978 drama films
Cultural depictions of Henry Kissinger
Cultural depictions of Richard Nixon
1970s American films